Hatebreed is the fifth studio album by American metalcore band Hatebreed. It was released on September 29, 2009. Frontman Jamey Jasta had this to say regarding the new album: "This is our fifth studio album and it's a monster! We've survived some pretty rough times and the music shows it. There was no reason to change the recipe that our fans know and love but we added a few brutal new ingredients and we're more than amped on the results. Violence is a given!" This is the first full-length, non-cover studio album that founding member and lead guitarist Wayne Lozinak appears on.

History 
Hatebreed had previously announced that in addition to their cover album For the Lions, they would release their fifth studio album in 2009.
On August 24, "In Ashes They Shall Reap" premiered on the band's official MySpace page. Three days later, they unveiled the artwork for the new album, followed by the release of the music video for "In Ashes They Shall Reap" on September 4. On September 10, RoadRunner Records UK made "Merciless Tide" available for free download.

Track listing

Personnel 
 Jamey Jasta – vocals
 Frank Novinec – rhythm guitar
 Chris Beattie – bass guitar
 Wayne Lozinak – lead guitar
 Matt Byrne – drums
 Produced, engineered and mixed by Chris "Zeuss" Harris

Charts

References 

2009 albums
Hatebreed albums
Albums produced by Chris "Zeuss" Harris